This is a list of Belgian television related events from 2002.

Events
17 February - Sergio & The Ladies are selected to represent Belgium at the 2002 Eurovision Song Contest with their song "Sister". They are selected to be the forty-fourth Belgian Eurovision entry during Eurosong held at the VRT Studios in Schelle.
15 December - Kelly Vandevenne wins season 3 of Big Brother.

Debuts

Television shows

1990s
Samson en Gert (1990–present)
Familie (1991–present)
Wittekerke (1993-2008)
Thuis (1995–present)
Wizzy & Woppy (1999-2007)

2000s
Big & Betsy (2000-2003)
Big Brother (2000-2007)

Ending this year
Wie wordt multimiljonair? (1999-2002)

Births

Deaths

See also
2002 in Belgium